Rosanna Malouf Peterson (born April 12, 1951) is a Senior United States district judge of the United States District Court for the Eastern District of Washington and a former professor at Gonzaga University School of Law. She is the first female judge to serve in the Eastern District.

Early life and education 

Born in Salt Lake City, Peterson attended the University of Utah from 1969 until 1970 and again from 1971 until 1972. She then earned a Bachelor of Arts degree cum laude from the University of North Dakota in 1977 and a Master of Arts degree in 1983 from the school. In 1991, she earned a Juris Doctor from the University of North Dakota School of Law.

Professional career 

Peterson worked from 1975 until 1978 as an instructor with the Grand Forks, North Dakota Park District and from 1979 until 1983 as a graduate teaching assistant at the University of North Dakota. From 1984 until 1988, Peterson was a lecturer at the University of North Dakota's Department of English. During law school in 1989, she served as a  judicial extern for North Dakota Judge Bruce Bohlman, and then in 1990 she served as a legal extern for United States Senator Kent Conrad. From 1991 until 1993, Peterson served as a staff attorney for United States District Court for the Eastern District of Washington Judge Frederick L. Van Sickle. Peterson then worked as an associate attorney for a Spokane law firm from 1993 until 1994 and then was a sole practitioner in 1995. She then served as an associate attorney for another Spokane law firm from 1995 until 1997, and then was partner in a different Spokane law firm from 1998 until 2002. From 1999 until present, Peterson has served as an adjunct professor (1999–2005), a visiting professor (2005–2007) and an assistant professor (2007 until 2010) at the Gonzaga University School of Law. She became the director of the law school's externship program in 2002.

Federal judicial service 

On October 13, 2009, President Obama nominated Peterson to serve as a judge on the United States District Court for the Eastern District of Washington to a seat vacated when Frederick Van Sickle assumed senior status. The United States Senate confirmed Peterson by an 89–0 vote on January 25, 2010. She received her commission on January 26, 2010. She served as Chief Judge from January 27, 2011 to January 27, 2016. She assumed senior status on October 1, 2021.

Notable cases

In 2015, Peterson became a central figure in Second Amendment and Tenth Amendment protests in Spokane.  Following the arrest of Anthony P. Bosworth on February 25, 2015, Peterson authored new rules banning firearms and other weapons on the grounds surrounding the Thomas S. Foley Federal Court in Spokane. Bosworth's arrest and detention on February 25 led to an additional protest on March 6, 2015, where a large crowd defied the judge's order by appearing armed on the Foley Courthouse plaza.

In 2019, Peterson made national headlines when she blocked the Trump Administration from implementing its changes to the “public charge” rule nationwide.

See also 
 List of first women lawyers and judges in Washington

References

External links

1951 births
Living people
20th-century American women lawyers
20th-century American lawyers
21st-century American judges
21st-century American women lawyers
21st-century American lawyers
21st-century American women judges
Gonzaga University faculty
Judges of the United States District Court for the Eastern District of Washington
Lawyers from Salt Lake City
United States district court judges appointed by Barack Obama
University of North Dakota alumni
University of North Dakota faculty